The KeSPA Cup (Hangul: 케스파컵) is an annual esports event organized by the Korean eSports Association. As of the 2021 edition, the tournament is organized for League of Legends. Until 2016, the tournament was also organized for StarCraft II.

History 
The first KeSPA cup was hosted in 2005 as a tournament to allow professional StarCraft teams to play against amateur teams. Events were also held for Special Force, Kartrider, and FreeStyle Street Basketball. The second event was held in 2007 at Sejong University and also included WarCraft III and Counter-Strike.

In 2014, seven years since the last event, KeSPA Cup was brought back for its modern iteration and it has been held every year since. StarCraft II was the only game that had a tournament in the relaunch of the initiative and it featured 16 of the year's best players playing for 8 million South Korean won. The following year, two tournaments for StarCraft II were held, the first in May and the second in July. League of Legends was added as one of the events in 2015.

In 2016, Alex "Neeb" Sunderhaft became the first non-Korean StarCraft player to win a major Korean tournament in sixteen years after winning the 2016 KeSPA Cup. The previous non-Korean champion was Guillaume Patry, who won the first OnGameNet StarLeague in 2000.

Tournaments

StarCraft 
The format for the original StarCraft KeSPA Cup was a team based event where professional teams under KeSPA played against amateur teams. There have been no more tournaments held for StarCraft since 2007.

StarCraft II 
KeSPA Cup was relaunched with a StarCraft II tournament. All of the tournaments are all part of the StarCraft II World Championship Series and thus award WCS points to the participants. The format for the tournament is a sixteen player elimination tournament starting with group stages and entering a playoffs round in the round of 8.

League of Legends 
League of Legends was added as a recurring event in 2015. 16 teams competed in the 2021 edition, including 9 academy rosters of the League of Legends Champions Korea teams, 3 amateur Korean teams, and 4 invited teams from Asia.

References

External links 
 Official website 

StarCraft competitions
League of Legends competitions
Esports competitions in South Korea
2005 establishments in South Korea